Mannoorkara  is a village in Thiruvananthapuram district in the state of Kerala, India.

Demographics
 India census, Mannoorkara had a population of 18273 with 8864 males and 9410 females.

References

Villages in Thiruvananthapuram district